Paul Steven Rickers (born 9 May 1975) is an English retired professional footballer who played as a midfielder for Oldham Athletic and Northampton Town in the Football League.

References

1975 births
Living people
Sportspeople from Pontefract
English footballers
Association football midfielders
Oldham Athletic A.F.C. players
Northampton Town F.C. players
Leigh Genesis F.C. players
Farsley Celtic A.F.C. players
Ossett Town F.C. players
Frickley Athletic F.C. players
Goole A.F.C. players
Guiseley A.F.C. players
English Football League players